Raúl "El Foch" Fernández Robert (September 17, 1905 – September 4, 1982) was a Mexican basketball player. He competed in the 1936 Summer Olympics. Born in Mexico City, Fernández was part of the Mexican basketball team, which won the bronze medal. He played in all seven of the squad's matches.

References

External links
Raúl Fernández's profile at databaseOlympics
XI JUEGOS OLIMPICOS BERLIN 1936 BRONCE | EQUIPO DE BALONCESTO 

1905 births
1982 deaths
Basketball players at the 1936 Summer Olympics
Mexican men's basketball players
Olympic basketball players of Mexico
Olympic bronze medalists for Mexico
Mexican people of French descent
Basketball players from Mexico City
Olympic medalists in basketball
Medalists at the 1936 Summer Olympics